Masters of the Sun Vol. 1 is the seventh studio album by American musical group Black Eyed Peas. A political album loosely inspired by the graphic novel of the same name and the contemporary social climate of the United States, it is a departure from The Black Eyed Peas' electronic dance and pop-influenced albums The E.N.D. and The Beginning, marking a return to the group's hip hop and boom bap style of their early career. The album was Black Eyed Peas' first in eight years, and their first credited as Black Eyed Peas (without a 'the' prefix) since Bridging the Gap in 2000; The album also marks the first appearance of J. Rey Soul as an official member, following the departure of Fergie in early 2018. Preceded by numerous singles and music videos, Masters of the Sun Vol. 1 was released on October 26, 2018 and it is the last Black Eyed Peas album with longtime label Interscope Records.

Background
Described by will.i.am as "party album[s]", the Black Eyed Peas released the electronic dance-influenced The E.N.D. and The Beginning in 2009 and 2010, following the 2008 election of Barack Obama as President of the United States. The band welcomed Obama's election; will.i.am had recorded and released "Yes We Can", a single that promoted Obama's election campaign during the Democratic Party primaries, and often claims the song had helped Obama get elected. The band's most commercially successful single during this period, "I Gotta Feeling", was inspired by the band's perception of being "in the center of a ginormous change in America". The track became the best-selling digital song of all time until it was surpassed by Pharrell Williams' "Happy" in 2014. By the end of 2010, The E.N.D. had sold over eleven million copies worldwide, while The Beginning had sold over two million copies worldwide. The band had intended to return to the studio to create their seventh studio album soon after the release of The Beginning, though frequent delays and Taboo's diagnosis with testicular cancer in 2014, along with his subsequent treatment and recovery, led to the project being put on hiatus.

The deteriorating political and social climate in the United States towards the end of Obama's presidency caused concern in the band, with deaths by law enforcement and the unrest in Ferguson, Missouri inspiring the band to write "Ring the Alarm" in 2014. In August 2016, the band released a remake of "Where Is the Love?", with updated lyrics and numerous featured artists, addressing topics such as the Black Lives Matter movement, gun violence in the United States, the Syrian civil war and refugee crisis, and terrorism in Europe. The band purposed the remake as a "[call] for calm" that asked "to stop the hate and violence that has resulted in many lives lost." In 2017, the Black Eyed Peas collaborated with Marvel Comics to release Masters of the Sun, a science fiction superhero graphic novel that references social issues and street culture in Los Angeles. The novel's adaptation for augmented reality devices featured a downbeat jazz and soul soundtrack composed by Hans Zimmer, which inspired the "mood" of the next Black Eyed Peas album. will.i.am was adamant about departing from the pop-centric sound of The E.N.D. and The Beginning, to the dismay of the group's record label Interscope.

Composition
Masters of the Sun Vol. 1 is a political album that addresses social issues such as gun violence, police brutality, race relations, and the effects of social media. will.i.am allegorizes the album's lyrical themes to a GPS, feeling that the "world wants some direction." The group stuck to a general philosophy of "art, smart, and heart" during the creative process, aiming to depict their philanthropic career through their music, in contrast to their earlier production-centric albums, and challenging themselves to constantly re-write lines to make them better. Musically, the album is a return to the group's hip hop and boom bap style from Behind the Front and Bridging the Gap, their first two albums released in 1998 and 2000, respectively. The Black Eyed Peas also took inspiration from Atban Klann, an early 1990s hip hop group that involved a teenage will.i.am and apl.de.ap; the group often envisioned what their teenage selves would have written about the world today. "Big Love" is a pop-rap track penned with the premise of "reminding the world the importance of love", drawing comparisons to "Where Is the Love?" from the Black Eyed Peas' 2003 album Elephunk. The song is based on a simple piano progression and gritty drum pattern, with lyrics referencing government corruption, drug addiction and gun control in the frame of a "day in the life of a kid in America", the song's opening line.

Promotion

Prior to the announcement and release of Masters of the Sun Vol. 1, the Black Eyed Peas released numerous singles throughout 2018 from recording sessions for the album: "Street Livin'" on January 9, "Ring the Alarm" on May 18, "Get It" on July 10, and "Constant" on August 30, each with accompanying music videos, the former three of which politically-charged. Coinciding with the release of "Ring the Alarm", the group's website was updated with interactive features that allowed users to earn digital tokens for positive interactions with the group on social media, which were redeemable for exclusive content and meet and greets with the group. Masters of the Sun Vol. 1 was announced via a press release by The Black Eyed Peas and Interscope Records on September 12, 2018. "Big Love" was simultaneously released as the lead single promoting the album. Its two-part music video raising awareness of gun control and anti-separation movements in the United States was released on September 21, and profits from sales of the single were donated to gun control activist group March for Our Lives and the anti-separation activist group Families Belong Together. Masters of the Sun Vol. 1 was released on October 26, 2018 by Interscope Records, after being delayed a fortnight past its intended release date of October 12. Pre-orders for the album started on October 19. It was the group's first album in eight years after the release of The Beginning in 2010.

The group appeared as one of two pre-match entertainment acts at the 2018 AFL Grand Final, along with Australian rock musician Jimmy Barnes, performing "Big Love" along with a number of their earlier hits with The Voice of the Philippines finalist Jessica Reynoso. The performance was met with criticism, especially for a moment in which will.i.am pulled out his phone mid-performance, prompting an apologetic response from will.i.am and Taboo on Twitter. The group will embark on the Masters of the Sun Tour to promote the album, performing fourteen shows across Europe in October and November 2018. A second leg of the tour in Asia will occur in 2019.

Controversy
British electronic musician Lone, along with his record label R&S, publicly accused the Black Eyed Peas of illegally sampling his 2013 track "Airglow Fires" for Masters of the Suns fifth track, "Constant". R&S alleged that neither the band or Interscope Records contacted them or Warp Publishing for permission to sample the track. Both the Black Eyed Peas and will.i.am had previously been embroiled in similar legal controversies over "Party All the Time" from The E.N.D. and "Let's Go" from #willpower.

Reception

Glenn Gamboa of Newsday praised the album as a "welcome return" for the band, writing that the band had "[recaptured] the edge the Peas once had" on "Yes or No", and singled out the socially conscious lyrics of "Ring the Alarm", jazz influences on "Vibrations", and Nicole Scherzinger's performance on "Wings" as positives.

Track listing

Notes
 signifies a producer for part 1
 signifies a producer for part 2
 signifies an additional producer
 signifies a co-producer
All track titles are capitalised, except for "pt.1 pt 2" in tracks 5 and 9, and "pt.1 pt.2 pt.3" in track 11. For example. "Ring the Alarm pt1. pt.2 pt.3" is stylised as "RING THE ALARM pt.1 pt.2 pt.3"

Personnel 
Black Eyed Peas
 will.i.am – vocals on all tracks, piano, keyboards, programming, turntables
 apl.de.ap – vocals on all tracks except 15 [Japan edition], turntables 
 Taboo – vocals on all tracks except 14 [Japan edition] and 15 [Japan edition], turntables
 J. Rey Soul – vocals on all tracks except 3, 7, and 14 [Japan edition]).

Additional musicians
 CL – vocals (track 6)
 Lauren Evans – co-writer (tracks 3, 5); vocals (track 3) 
 Ludacris – associate producer (track 7)
 Ali Shaheed Muhammad – bass guitar (track 7) 
 Nas – vocals (track 1)
 Phife Dawg – vocals (track 7) 
 Posdnuos – vocals (track 7) 
 Karlina Covington – vocals (track 7) 
 Nicole Scherzinger – vocals (track 10)
 Slick Rick – vocals (track 5)
 DJ Motiv8 – co-producer (track 11) 
 Mooky Mook – co-writer (tracks 1, 4, 6, 7, 11, 12, and 13 [Japan edition])

Charts

Release history

References
Sources

 
 

Citations

External links
 Official website of The Black Eyed Peas

2018 albums
Albums involved in plagiarism controversies
Albums produced by will.i.am
Black Eyed Peas albums
Interscope Records albums
Sampling controversies
Political music albums by American artists